The 2010 Danish Touringcar Championship season was the 11th and last Danish Touringcar Championship (DTC) season. Four of the race weekends will be held together with the Swedish Touring Car Championship and the results from these races will also count towards the Scandinavian Touring Car Cup. From 2011, the new Scandinavian Touring Car Championship will replace both the Swedish and the Danish Touring Car Championships.

In 2012 the series was succeeded by the Danish Thundersport Championship, using the Camaro Cup cars as a basis.

Teams and drivers
The official entry list for the 2010 DTC season was released on April 13.

Race calendar and results
The calendar for the 2010 season was published in December 2009. As a first step towards the planned merger with the Swedish Touring Car Championship, four of the races will be held together with STCC.

*Joint STCC and DTC races. In the joint STCC and DTC races, only the highest placed DTC driver/team is listed

Championship standings

Drivers' Championship

Bold – PoleItalics – Fastest Lap

† — Drivers did not finish the race, but were classified as they completed over 90% of the race distance.

Teams' Championship

Bold – PoleItalics – Fastest lap

References

Danish Touringcar Championship
Motorsport competitions in Denmark
2010 in Danish motorsport